XHEOQ-FM (91.7 MHz) is a Spanish news/talk radio radio station that serves the McAllen, Texas (USA) / Reynosa, Tamaulipas (Mexico) border area.

History
XEOQ-AM 1110 received its concession on July 1, 1960. It was originally owned by Baudelia Villagrana Martel.

The station began its AM-FM migration, signing on in July 2018.

The AM station was turned off in February 2020 after the required year of simulcasting.

HD Radio
XHEOQ-FM broadcasts in HD Radio and broadcasts 3 subchannels. Aside from the HD1, these additional subchannels are also on XHO-FM:

HD1: Notigape 91.7
HD2: Radio Fórmula 1° Cadena
HD3: W Radio
HD4: El Heraldo Radio

No authorization is on file with the IFT for these additional services. The HD2 sub was ESPN Deportes Radio until that network ceased operations on September 8, 2019; Unanimo was created with the goal of attracting the network's former affiliates and talent.

External links

References

Spanish-language radio stations
Radio stations in Reynosa